Sultan is an unincorporated community in the Unorganized North Part of Sudbury District in northeastern Ontario, Canada.

The local economy is based primarily on hunting and related tourism. In the past the logging industry formed the mainstay of the economy.

The primary access to Sultan by car is by Highway 667 and Sultan Industrial Road, an unpaved logging road connecting to Highway 144. Via Rail's Sudbury–White River train goes through Sultan, providing an alternate transportation route to White River and Sudbury, although the Sultan railway station is a flag stop and consists of only a stop sign.

Sultan was formerly administered by a local services board, which was dissolved in 2008. The community, which holds the status of designated place in Statistics Canada census data, had a reported population of 49 in the Canada 2011 Census.

Demographics 

References

Communities in Sudbury District
Designated places in Ontario